The Olive Harvest is a 2003 Palestinian film directed by Hanna Elias. It won the "Best Arab film" award for 2003 at the Cairo International Film Festival, and it was Palestine's submission to the 77th Academy Awards for the Academy Award for Best Foreign Language Film, but was not accepted as a nominee.

See also
List of submissions to the 77th Academy Awards for Best Foreign Language Film
 List of Palestinian submissions for the Academy Award for Best Foreign Language Film

References

External links

2003 films
Palestinian drama films
2003 drama films
Films set in the Middle East